The School Life Museum (in Greek:Μουσείο Σχολικής Ζωής) is a museum in Nerokouros, Chania, Crete, Greece.

The museum seeks to develop into a centre of culture which will focus on the educational and pedagogical practices of the past, the present and the future.

External links
Official webpage 
Prefecture of Chania 

School museums
Museums in Chania
History museums in Greece